The 1990 Diet Pepsi Championships was a men's tennis tournament played on indoor carpet courts at the Wembley Arena in London, England. It was part of the 1990 ATP Tour. It was the 15th and last edition of the tournament and was held from 5 November until 11 November 1990. Seventh-seeded Jakob Hlasek won the singles title.

Finals

Singles

 Jakob Hlasek defeated  Michael Chang, 7–6, 6–3
 It was Hlasek's 1st singles title of the year and the 4th of his career.

Doubles

 Jim Grabb /  Patrick McEnroe defeated  Rick Leach /  Jim Pugh, 7–6, 4–6, 6–3
 It was Grabb's single title of the year and the 6th of his career. It was McEnroe's single title of the year and the 5th of his career.

References

External links
 ITF tournament edition details

Diet Pepsi Championships
Wembley Championships
1990 sports events in London
1990 in English tennis
Diet Pepsi Championships